Constantine Kalamanos or Coloman (1137/1145 – after 1173) was a Byzantine governor of Cilicia.

Biography
Constantine was the elder son of Boris Kalamanos (a claimant for the throne of the Kingdom of Hungary) and his wife, Anna Doukaina (a relative of the Byzantine Emperor John II Komnenos). His paternal grandmother, Euphemia was caught in adultery by her husband, King Coloman of Hungary who never recognised her son (Constantine' father) as his own.

In 1163, the Emperor Manuel I Komnenos appointed Constantine to the office of governor of Cilicia, a province of the Empire whose fortresses had just been occupied by the Armenian Prince Thoros II of Cilicia. He went with strengthened forces to his province and Prince Thoros had to retire to the mountains. The Princess Constance of Antioch desired to keep her power against her son, Bohemond III of Antioch, who became by then of an age to govern, appealed to Constantine for military aid. However, the rumour of her appeal provoked a riot in Antioch and she was exiled.

Shortly afterwards, Constantine and Prince Bohemond III lead their troops together against Nur ad-Din Zangi's armies that had laid siege to Krak des Chevaliers, a fortress in the County of Tripoli. After the Battle of al-Buqaia in 1163, in which Constantine and his troops particularly distinguished themselves, Nur ad-Din fled in disorder to Homs.

In the summer of 1164, Nur ad-Din laid siege the fortress of Harim in the Principality of Antioch. Upon Prince Bohemond's call, Constantine went to his rescue with his troops, and at the news of their coming, Nur ad-Din raised the siege. While he was retiring, the Christian forces followed him, and their armies made contact on 10 August. The ensuing battle of Harim was a disaster for the Christians: their leaders (among them Constantine) were captured and they were taken to Aleppo. However, Nur ad-Din was so anxious not to offend the Byzantine Empire that he freed Constantine almost at once (1166), in return for a hundred and fifty silken robes.

During his captivity, Cilicia was governed by Alexios Axouch and then by Andronikos I Komnenos who seduced Philippa, the beautiful sister of Prince Bohemund III. When Constantine was freed, the Emperor Manuel I recalled Andronikos Komnenos and reinstalled him in his place. Constantine was also ordered to proceed to Antioch and to try to capture Philippa's affection, but he failed.

In 1170, the Armenian Prince Mleh of Cilicia invaded the Byzantine province of Cilicia with the assistance of Nur ad-Din and took Mopsuestia, Adana and Tarsus from their garrisons. Although Constantine could reoccupy the lost territories with the help of King Amalric I of Jerusalem and Prince Bohemund III, but a year or so later he was captured by Prince Mleh.

Sources
 Kristó, Gyula (editor): Korai Magyar Történeti Lexikon - 9–14. század (Encyclopedia of the Early Hungarian History - 9-14th centuries); Akadémiai Kiadó, 1994, Budapest; .
 

House of Árpád
Byzantine governors of Cilicia
Byzantine people of the Crusades
12th-century Byzantine people
Hungarian princes
Year of birth uncertain
Year of death unknown
Byzantine Anatolians
Byzantine prisoners of war
Officials of Manuel I Komnenos